This is a list of African Americans who have served as United States federal judges. , 280 African-Americans have served on the federal bench.

United States Supreme Court

United States Courts of Appeals

United States District Courts

Other federal courts

See also 
List of African-American jurists

External links 
 Article III African-American Judges by President

Lists of 20th-century people
Lists of 21st-century people

Federal judges
Lists of American judges
United States federal judges